David Oscar Lebón (Buenos Aires, October 5, 1952) is an Argentine rock multi-instrumentalist, singer and songwriter of Argentinian rock, long considered during the 70s and 80s the best guitar player in the country..

Career
Born into a family of immigrants (his father was Basque-French and his mother a Russian), Lebón lived his childhood in Ituzaingó, Buenos Aires, with his father and three sisters.
By age eight, he moved to the United States of America with his mother, their residence in the US coincided with the "Beatlemania", popular phenomenon which influenced on his future career as musician. He even got the chance to see them at the famous Shea Stadium Concert in 1965.

In the late '60s Lebón returned to Buenos Aires, where he was part of several rock bands throughout the '70s, playing different instruments, such as Pappo's Blues (bass and rhythm guitar), La Pesada del Rock and Roll (guitar), Pescado Rabioso (vocals, bass and guitar), Color Humano (drums), Polifemo (vocals, guitar and bass), and Serú Girán (vocals and guitar), among others. 

Since 1982, after his tenure in the aforementioned group Serú Girán, David Lebón has developed a stable solo career, gaining popularity as a solo artist, especially during the '80s, and also collaborating with musicians like Charly García, Luis Alberto Spinetta, Celeste Carballo or Pedro Aznar, to name just some. 
In 2012, the Argentine edition of Rolling Stone magazine placed him in third place on the list of the 100 best Argentine rock guitar players.

Discography (solo)
David Lebón (1973)
Nayla (1980)
El tiempo es veloz (1982)
Siempre estaré (1983)
Desnuque (1984)
Si de algo sirve (1985)
7 × 7 (1986)
Nunca te puedo alcanzar (1987)
Contactos (1989)
Nuevas mañanas (1991)
En vivo, en el Teatro Coliseo (Live, 1999)
Yo lo soñé (2002)
Déjà vu (2009)
Encuentro supremo (2016)
Lebón & Co (2019)

References

David Lebón page and discography on Discogs.com

1952 births
Living people
Argentine rock musicians
20th-century Argentine male singers
Musicians from Buenos Aires
Argentine male singer-songwriters
Singers from Buenos Aires
Rock en Español musicians
Argentine multi-instrumentalists
Argentine people of Russian descent
Argentine people of French descent
People from Ituzaingó Partido